The 29th Virginia Infantry Regiment was an infantry regiment raised in Virginia for service in the Confederate States Army during the American Civil War. It fought mostly in western Virginia, Kentucky, North Carolina, and Virginia.

The 29th Virginia was authorized in November, 1861, and was to contain seven companies under Colonel A.C. Moore and three companies at Pound Gap. However, this organization never took place. Moore's five companies from Abingdon and companies raised in the spring of 1862 evidently made up the nine-company regiment. The men were recruited from the counties of Fayette, Raleigh, Mercer, Wise, Russell, Tazewell, Wythe, and Carroll.

It was assigned to the Valley District, Department of Northern Virginia, then moved to Kentucky where it was engaged at Middle Creek. Later it saw action in Western Virginia and for a time served in North Carolina under General French.

In March, 1863, it totalled 732 men. Attached to General Corse's Brigade the unit participated in Longstreet's Suffolk Expedition and during the Gettysburg Campaign was on detached duty in Tennessee and North Carolina. In the spring of 1864 it returned to Virginia and took its place in the Petersburg trenches north and south of the James River and ended the war at Appomattox. Many were lost at Sayler's Creek, and only 1 officer and 27 men surrendered on April 9, 1865.

The field officers were Colonels James Giles and Alfred C. Moore; Lieutenant Colonels Alexander Haynes, William Leigh, and Edwin R. Smith; and Majors Ebenezer Bruster, William R.B. Horne, and Isaac White.

See also

List of Virginia Civil War units
List of West Virginia Civil War Confederate units

References

Units and formations of the Confederate States Army from Virginia
1861 establishments in Virginia
Military units and formations established in 1861
1865 disestablishments in Virginia
Military units and formations disestablished in 1865